Stephen Pugh (born 27 November 1973) is a Welsh former professional footballer who played as a forward. He made appearances in the English Football League with Wrexham. He also won 2 caps for Wales U21.

References

1973 births
Living people
English footballers
Association football forwards
Wrexham A.F.C. players
Bangor City F.C. players
Porthmadog F.C. players
English Football League players
Wales under-21 international footballers